The 1905 Copa de Honor Cousenier was the final match to decide the winner of the Copa de Honor Cousenier, the 1st. edition of the international competition organised by the Argentine and Uruguayan Associations together. The final was contested by Uruguayan side Club Nacional de Football and Argentine team Alumni. 

The match was held in the Estadio Gran Parque Central in Montevideo, on September 10, 1905. Nacional beat Alumni 3–2 with goals by Rincón (2) and de Castro, achieving its first Cousenier trophy.

Qualified teams 

Note

Venue

Match details 

|

References

c
c
1905 in Argentine football
1905 in Uruguayan football